Doug Woolard is a retired collegiate athletic director.

Career
Woolard held sports administration roles at Washington State University starting in 1988. Woolard was named athletic director at Saint Louis University in October 1994. He remained there until May 2004, when he was hired as athletic director at the University of South Florida.

In January 2014, Woolard was reassigned from his role as athletic director, pending the expiration of his contract.  Woolard retired from the University with an accelerating agreement in July, 2014.

In 2016, auditors named Woolard and other staff in reports of over-payment of 2014 salaries in possible violation of Florida law.

Family
Woolard and wife, Cherrie, are the parents of two children, Chris and Amy.

References

External links
 South Florida profile

Saint Louis Billikens athletic directors
South Florida Bulls athletic directors